Margarites ryukyuensis is a species of sea snail, a marine gastropod mollusk in the family Margaritidae.

Description

Distribution
This marine species occurs in the Okinawa Trough.

References

ryukyuensis
Gastropods described in 2000